Ukroboronprom (UOP; , Ukrainian Defence Industry) is an association of multi-product enterprises (conglomerate or concern) in various sectors of the defence industry of Ukraine. Ukroboronprom has ceased most of its activities across Ukraine since the 2022 Russian invasion of Ukraine and has relocated much of its production abroad during the war.

The concern includes enterprises that operate in the development, manufacture, sale, repair, modernization and disposal of weapons, military and special equipment and ammunition, and participating in military-technical cooperation with foreign states.

The organisation has the functions of strategic planning, interaction with public authorities, and coordination with divisions. This approach allows the top management of the organisation to focus on strategic decisions and long-term programs of the defence industry.

In 2021, Ukroboronprom was under state reform and was expected to cease to exist and reform into main two holdings of Defence Holding and Aerospace Holding.

History 

“Ukroboronprom” was created by the decrees of the President of Ukraine in 2010 (12 September, No. 1085/2010 and 28 December, No. 1245/2010) with additional decrees of the Cabinet of Ministers of 29.12.2010 No. 1221 and 31.08.2011 No. 993.

The main goal of “Ukroboronprom” is the efficient management of Ukrainian military industrial sector and improvement of the effectiveness of the enterprises that are parts of State Concern.

In September 2013, five divisions were created for the organizational structure of Ukroboronprom: aircraft industry and aircraft maintenance; precision weaponry and munition; armoured vehicles, automotive equipment, engineering and special equipment; shipbuilding and marine facilities; radar, radio communications and air defense systems.

As separate divisions stand those, that are authorized to conduct import/export operations with military equipment and wares that hold National Security information. These enterprises conduct international sales of equipment produced by Ukrainian military industrial sector and post-sales service of equipment, maintenance, and modernization.

Roman Romanov, a graduate of the International Institute of Management (MiM-Kyiv), headed “Ukroboronprom” since 4 June 2014. As a result of his activity, “Ukroboronprom” finally became profitable by the end of 2014.

At the end-year 2014 “Ukroboronprom” fulfilled all government contracts by 100%. During the second half of the year 2014, the enterprises of the Concern created more than 2000 jobs and 13 more enterprises became profitable. Moreover, over the second half of the year wage arrears to employees totaling to 45 million UAH were overtaken.

In August 2016, “Ukroboronprom” signed a memorandum of cooperation with the former head of the Agency for Defence Advanced Research Projects (DARPA) Anthony Tetter. He became an advisor on the long-term development of “Ukroboronprom”.

“Ukroboronprom” was the first among Ukrainian industrial giants to launch a system of e-procurement. Its official start was in October 2014. The concern claims they saved US$304.8 million in 2015, and in 2016 – 476.6 million UAH.

Ukroboronprom increased its production and began to provide Ukraine's Armed Forces with modernized weaponry. In 2017, Ukroboronprom completed the State Defence Order and conveyed 3,673 units of weapons and equipment to the security agencies of the country, including 2,053 new and upgraded ones.

For 2014–2017, Ukroboronprom rose by 14 positions – from 91 to 77th place – in the SIPRI world ranking of arms manufacturers.

Ukroboronprom together with the American company Delphi Corporation has launched a new enterprise "Electric Systems". It has become the official supplier of components for Mercedes products.

The Cyber Guard project from Ukroboronprom became the general partner of the cyberforum HackIT-2017. The event was attended by co-founder of Apple Steve Wozniak.

On 12 February 2018 Roman Romanov resigned and was replaced on 21 February 2018 when the President of Ukraine appointed Pavlo Bukin as Director General. Aivaras Abromavičius succeeded him on 31 August 2019. Abromavičius was succeeded by Ihor Fomenko on 6 October 2020. Yuriy Husev was placed as General Director in December 2020.

2022-23 Russian invasion 

During the 2022 Russian invasion of Ukraine, Ukroboronprom Concern provided repair and maintenance for both Ukrainian vehicles and captured Russian vehicles. Ukroboronprom also offered US$1,000,000 to Russian pilots for every combat-capable aircraft handed over to them as well as $500,000 for every combat-capable helicopter handed over. 

On March 6, Ukroboronprom Concern's Zhytomyr Armour Plant was destroyed causing the deaths of 3 people. On April 15, the Ukroboronprom Concern Vizar Plant was struck with several sea-based long-range missiles. The plant produced R-360 Neptune cruise missiles for the Armed Forces of Ukraine and is believed that the strikes were reprisals for the sinking of the Russian warship Moskva, which 2 Neptune cruise missiles were responsible for. 

On September 20, it was announced that Ukroboronprom Concern and an unspecified NATO member country were to build a factory for the production of ammunition that will be held to NATO standards. 

On October 17, following the October 2022 Russian missile strikes on Ukrainian targets, Ukroboronprom Concern and the Come Back Alive Foundation independently announced the preparations of a weapon that could "create explosions in Moscow" with a range of up to 1000 kilometres and equipped with a 75 kilogram warhead. It was later revealed that the weapon was an unmanned aerial vehicle and is rumored to be responsible for several attacks on Russian military infrastructure in Saratov, Ryazan, and Kursk.

On 15 March, Ukroboronprom, with the help of a "NATO country", have started manufacturing of 125 mm smoothbore ammunition for Ukraine's Soviet era tanks outside of Ukraine. Along with existing production of 120mm mortar rounds, 122 mm and 152 mm artillery shells. A part of a larger effort by Ukraine to manufacture ammunition as Western donors feel the "pinch" in their own stockpiles. 10 employees have been killed thus far during the war. Production sites have had to be dispersed to avoid destruction. The company spokesperson said that "The emergence of this shell is the first product of our joint cooperation with a country from the (NATO) alliance. It will not end with shells, we will soon show you other products produced with partner countries,"

General background
The conglomerate was established in 2010 in place of the existing "Armoured Equipment of Ukraine" (1999) and "Technological Military Service".

The feasibility of combining in a single management structure of scientific, experimental, industrial enterprises and special exporters is supported by the positive effect, that the Concern has shown during its existence. Formation of Ukroboronprom made available  organization of an innovation cycle "research - development - serial production - consumption (sales) - service - utilization".

To ensure optimal decision-making in different fields the State Concern uses a concept of divisional management structure. The concept was adopted taking into account current trends in theory and practice of management. Its essence is to separate strategic and operational objectives from industry operational problems management. A divisional principle is to provide administrative and economic "autonomy" of industries, a delegation of administrative powers of heads of divisions.

Initially it consisted of seven major state companies:

 Ukrspetsexport
 Spetstechnoexport
 Ukroboronservice
 Progress
 Specialized Foreign-trade company "Prohres"
 Ukrinmash
 Promoboronexport
 Tasko-Export

In 2014 the conglomerate included 134 enterprises of the military–industrial complex of Ukraine and employed some 120,000 people. In 2012 eighteen of those companies were to be reorganized (Resolution #223, March 21, 2012). They included:
 Kharkiv Morozov Machine-Building Design Bureau 
 Kharkiv Engine Building Design Bureau
 Ship Building Research Project Center
 Shostka State Factory "Zirka" (Star)
 Science Producing Complex "Iskra" (Spark)
 Chemical State Association of Petrovsky
 others
According to the company, China and India are a traditional market for Ukrainian military products. In 2013, the Brazilian Navy announced a potential partnership with Ukroboronprom.

In March 2014, after the 2014 Crimean crisis, the company barred all exports of weaponry and military equipment to Russia.

Structure 
State Concern consists of 134 military industry sector enterprises of Ukraine (123 state enterprises and 9 joint stock corporations, with the profits participation rights delegated to the management of “Ukroboronprom”).

Manufacturing and design sector

Armored vehicles, artillery armament, automotive, and special engineering equipment

 "Artyleriyske Ozbroyennia" (Artillery Weaponry) Design Bureau (Kyiv)
 45th Experimental Mechanical Factory (Vinnytsia)
 Donetsk Treasury Factory of Chemicals (Donetsk)
 Feodosiya Optical Factory (Feodosiya, Autonomous Republic of Crimea)
 Izyum Device Manufacturing Factory (Izyum)
 Kharkiv Plant of Special Vehicles (Kharkiv)
 Kharkiv Plant of Transporting Equipment (Kharkiv)
 Kharkiv Design Bureau of Engine Manufacturing (Kharkiv)
 Kharkiv Automobile Plant (Kharkiv)
 Kharkiv Armored Vehicle Plant (Kharkiv)
 Kharkiv Mechanical Plant (Kharkiv)
 Malyshev Factory (Kharkiv)
Kharkiv Morozov Machine Building Design Bureau (Kharkiv)
 Kyiv Automobile Repair Plant (Kyiv)
 Kyiv Armored Vehicle Plant (Kyiv)
 Kremenchuk Automobile Plant KrAZ (Kremenchuk)
 Lviv Armored Vehicle Plant (Lviv) 
 "Mayak" Factory (Kyiv)
 Mykolaiv Armored Vehicle Plant (Mykolaiv)
 Nizhyn Repair Factory of Military Engineering Vehicles (Nizhyn)
 Research and Production Complex "Photoprylad" (Photo-device) (Cherkasy)
 Rivne Automobile Repair Plant (Rivne)
 Shepetivka Repair Factory (Shepetivka)
 Ukrainian State Research Institute of Structural Materials "Prometei" (Mariupol)
 Science and Technology Complex "Zavod Tochnoyi Mekhaniky" (Precise Mechanics Factory) (Kamianets-Podilskyi)
 Zaporizhzhia Engineering Design Bureau of Academician Ivchenko "Prohres" (Progress) (Zaporizhzhia)
 Zhytomyr Armored Vehicle Plant (Zhytomyr)

Shipbuilding

 Research and Production Association "Kyivskyi Zavod Avtomatyky" (Kyiv Factory of Automation) (Kyiv)
 State Research and Design Shipbuilding Center (Mykolaiv)
 Mykolayiv Shipyard (Mykolaiv)
 Kherson Factory "Palada" (Pallada) (Kherson)
 Kherson Factory "Sudmash" (Ship engineering) (Kherson)
 Central Design Bureau "Izumrud" (Emerald) (Kherson)
 Research Institute of Radiolocation Systems "Kvant-Radiolokatsiya" (Quantum-Radiolocation) (Kyiv)
 Kyiv State Factory "Burevisnyk" (Storm-petrel) (Kyiv)
 Ukrainian State Research Institute of Structural Materials "Prometei" (Mariupol)
 Research Design Bureau "Promin" (Ray) (Donetsk)
 Fiolent Factory (Felenk, Tiger) (Simferopol)
 Feodosiya Shipyards "More" (Sea) (Feodosiya)
 Skloplastyk (Plexiglass) (Feodosiya)
 Special Site of Technical Production "Polumia" (Flame) (Sevastopol)
 Design-Technology Bureau "Sudokompozyt" (Ship-composite) (Feodosiya)
 Central Design Bureau "Chonomorets" (Black Sea sailor) (Sevastopol)
 Feodosiya Ship Mechanical Factory (Feodosiya)
 "Oryzon-Navihatsiya" (Horizon-Navigation) (Smila)
 Research and Production Complex of Gas-turbine Engineering "Zoria-Mashproekt" (Dawn Engineering Project) (Mykolaiv)

Radiolocation, RF Signal and Air Defence systems
 "Rubin" (Ruby) (Uman)
 Research Institute of Radio-electronics (Kharkiv)
 Central Design Bureau "Proton" (Kharkiv)
 Zmiiv Power Engineering Repair Factory (Zmiiv)
 Balakliya Repair Factory (Balakliya)
 2nd Repair Factory of Signal Devices (Berezhany)
 Ternopil Science Technology Company "Promin" (Ray) (Ternopil)
 Research Institute "Shtorm" (Storm) (Odesa)
 Special Design Bureau "Molniya" (Lightning) (Odesa)
 Technical Production Company "Hranit" (Granite) (Odesa)
 Southern Technical Production Company (Mykolaiv)
 Ukrainian Radio-frequency Engineering Institute (Mykolaiv)
 Lviv Research Institute of Radio-frequency Engineering (Lviv)
 Lviv Radio-frequency Repair Factory (Lviv)
 Kvant Factory (Quantum) (Kyiv)
 "Meridian" of Korolyov (Kyiv)
 Kyiv Factory "Radar" (Kyiv)
 Research Institute "Buran" (Kyiv)
 Henerator Factory (Generator) (Kyiv)
 Special Design Bureau "Spektr" (Kyiv)
 Research Institute "Kvant" (Quantum) (Kyiv)
 Science Technology Complex "Impuls" (Impulse) (Kyiv)
 Research and Production Complex "Iskra" (Spark) (Kyiv)
 Zaporizhzhia Company "Radioprylad" (Radio-frequency device) (Zaporizhzhia)
 Zhytomyr Repair Factory of Radio-frequency equipment "Promin" (Ray) (Zhytomyr)
 Research Institute of Complex Automation (Donetsk)
 Design Bureau of RF Signal (Sevastopol)
 Lviv State Factory "Lorta" (Lviv)
 Production Union "Karpaty" (Carpathians) (Ivano-Frankivsk)

Aircraft
 Antonov (Kyiv)
Antonov Serial Production Plant (Kyiv)
 Kyiv Aircraft Repair Plant 410 (Kyiv)
 Kharkiv State Aviation Manufacturing Enterprise (Kharkiv)
 171st Chernihiv Repair Plant (Chernihiv)
 Chuhuiv Repair Plant (Chuhuiv)
 Mykolaiv Repair Plant "NARP" (Mykolaiv)
 Research Company "Koneks" (Lviv)
 Lviv State Aircraft Repair Plant (Lviv)
 Repair Factory of Radio-frequency Equipment (Kropyvnytskyi)
 Ukrainian Research Institute of Aviation Technology (Kyiv)
 Central Research Institute of Navigation and Administration (Kyiv)
 Design Bureau of Laser Technology (Kyiv)
 Spetsoboronmash (Kyiv, formerly "Artem" Engineering Company)
 General Aviation Design Bureau of Ukraine (Kyiv)
 Radiovymiryuvach (Kyiv)
 Zaporizhzhia Aircraft Repair Plant "MiGremont" (Zaporizhzhia)
 Zakarpattia Helicopter Producing Association (Dubove)
 Lutsk Repair Plant "Motor" (Lutsk)
 732nd Vinnytsia Repair Plant (Vinnytsia)
 Vinnytsia Aviation Factory "ViAZ" (Vinnytsia)
 Research Center "Vertolit" (Feodosiya)
 Research Institute of Aero-Elastic Systems (Feodosiya)
 Sevastopol Aviation Company (Sevastopol)
 Yevpatoriya Aviation Repair Factory (Yevpatoriya)
 "Artem" Holding Company
 Novator (Khmelnytskyi)
 Kharkiv Engineering Factory "FED" (Kharkiv)
 Odesa Aviation Factory (Odesa)
 Krasyliv Aggregate Factory (Krasyliv)

High-precision armament and ammunition
 Shostka Treasury Factory "Zirka" (Shostka)
 Shostka Treasury Factory "Impuls" (Shostka)
 Research Institute of Chemical Products (Shostka)
 Zhulyany Engineering Factory "Vizar" (Vyshneve)
 Donetsk Factory of Chemical Products (Donetsk)
 Design Bureau "Artyleriyske Ozbroyennia" (Kyiv)
 State Kyiv Design Bureau "Luch" (Kyiv)
 Science-Production Complex "Prohres" (Nizhyn)

Contracts and trading
 Ukrspetsexport
Spetsteknoexport

Other
 Southern Aviation Industrial Adjustment (Zaporizhzhia)
 Kharkiv Aggregate Design Bureau (Kharkiv)
 Tiachiv Factory "Zenit" (Tiachiv)
 Konotop Aircraft Repair Plant "Aviakon" (Konotop)
 Luhansk Aircraft Repair Plant (Luhansk)
 Yuzhmash (Dnipro)
 Pavlohrad Chemical Plant (Pavlohrad)
 Luhansk cartridge plant (Ukraine's only small arms ammunition manufacturer. It was captured by the Luhansk People's Republic during the War in Donbass)

Directors General 
 01/2011 - 02/2012 - Dmytro Salamatin
 02/2012 - 06/2012 - Dmytro Perehudov
 06/2012 – 03/2014 - Serhiy Hromov
 03/2014 – 04/2014- Serhiy Averchenko
 04/2014 – 02/2018 - Roman Romanov
 02/2018 – 8/2019 - Pavlo Bukin
 8/2019–10/2020 - Aivaras Abromavičius
 10/2020–12/2020 - Ihor Fomenko
 12/2020–present - Yuriy Husev

University cooperation 
“Ukroboronprom” has cooperation with Central Scientific Research Institute of Armaments and Military Equipment of Armed Forces of Ukraine and leading Ukrainian universities like Kyiv-Mohyla Academy, Kyiv Polytechnic Institute, Kharkiv Polytechnic, V. N. Karazin Kharkiv National University, ME Zhukovsky KAU, Kharkiv National University of Radio Electronics and I. Kozhedub Kharkiv University of Air Force.

Best inventions of Ukrainian students are being embodied. Scientists of the Kyiv Polytechnic Institute have created a UAV. Students of other universities are actively involved in apprenticeship on the leading enterprises of Ukroboronprom.

In 2016, “Ukroboronprom” began to work with the best business schools in the country. In particular, the International Management Institute and Kyiv-Mohyla Business School. Senior management, management of the average level plants and industrials undergo training.

At the end of 2017 "Ukroboronprom" and Igor Sikorsky Kyiv Polytechnic Institute opened a new master's program “Management in the field of defence and industrial complex”.

In 2017, a series of MBA curricula for “Ukroboronprom” specialists was completed, including a partnership with the US Thunderbird School of Global Management and the International Management Institute in Kyiv.

New developments 
In the summer of 2016, “Ukroboronprоm” presented multipurpose unmanned aircraft complex “Gorlytsa” and tactical unmanned multipurpose vehicle “Phantom”.

On September 28, 2016, at the international exhibition of armaments “ADEX-2016” in Azerbaijan, the State Concern introduced a new combat module “Taipan” which specifications meet the highest Western standards.

In 2016, “Ukroboronprom” also developed and presented a digital fire control system “Myslyvets”, combat modules “Duplet” and “Kastet”, 60 mm mortar KBA.118, and transport aircraft An-132.

At the beginning of 2017, “Ukroboronprom” agreed with the American company “Aeroscraft” on co-production of automatic M16 rifle (model WAC47) that meets NATO standards.
As of October, 1st, 2019, no weapon of this type and model has been produced, confirming the inappropriate technical choices voiced by many experts.

In March 2017, the newest multipurpose transport aircraft An-132 successfully made its first flight. “Ukroboronprom” agreed with the companies TAQNIA (Saudi Arabia) and Havelsan (Turkey) to develop a new modification of the aircraft for the marine patrol.

At the 13th International exhibition of military equipment “IDEF-2017” in Istanbul, “Ukroboronprom” introduced a new portable grenade launcher.

In 2017, “Ukroboronprom” successfully implemented a number of international projects. Together with the American company Aeroscraft, it introduced the automatic carbine M4-WAC-47 according to NATO standards. It can be adapted for a variety of calibers, including 5.56x45 NATO. As of October 1, 2019, no weapon of this type and model has been produced, confirming the inappropriate technical choices voiced by many experts.

Two Ukrainian-Polish projects have also been created and demonstrated: main battle tank PT-17 and multiple launch rocket system ZRN-01 Stokrotka.

In November 2017, the first Ukrainian combat drone "Gorlytsia" performed the first flight.

In 2017, "Ukroboronprom" successfully tested a new Ukrainian missile complex "Vilkha". Unique shells of missiles are made from superstructural alloys on the new technological line of “Ukroboronprom".

On 4 November 2022, Ukrainian Defence Minister Oleksii Reznikov has announced that Ukroboronprom will start manufacturing shells at 152 and 122mm calibre for its Soviet era weapons. 

On 18 November 2022, Ukroboronprom signed an agreement to manufacture and develop weapons with other NATO countries including: Poland, Czech Republic, France, Denmark and two unknown countries subject to a non disclosure agreement. The statement said: “We are creating joint defense enterprises, building closed-cycle ammunition production lines, jointly producing armored vehicles and multiple launch rocket systems, and jointly developing new high-tech weapons. To do this, we use both existing facilities and newly created ones in safe places,” 

On 1 January, the first domestically made Ukrainian 152mm artillery shells has been seen being fired from a D-20 howitzer in the Donbas. Ukroboronprom has also confirmed this on social media.

International activity 
“Ukroboronprom” actively works with foreign partners and has signed contracts to deploy production in Ukraine. For example, “Ukroboronprom” and Polish company Lubawa SA signed a memorandum on the establishment of new joint ventures in Ukraine, that will get 1 million euros investment.

At the international exhibition “Arms and Security 2015” in Kyiv, “Ukroboronprom” agreed on cooperation with the American company “Textron” in the production of heavy armored vehicles. The cooperation between “Antonov” and Polish company “WB Electronics” was also agreed. Ukraine will use the technology of the Polish company to develop a new tactical unmanned aviation complex for the Armed Forces.

At one of the largest Asian international defence exhibition “Defence & Security 2015”, “Ukroboronprom” signed an agreement with the enterprise authorized by the Ministry of Defence of Thailand to manufacture modern Ukrainian BTR-3E1 and ensure its service in the Kingdom.

At the International Aviation Salon Dubai Air Show in 2015, “Antonov” and the company “Taqnia Aeronautics” signed two memorandums on cooperation in promoting 4 sanitary AN-148-100, 4 reconnaissance and rescue variants of the AN-132, and 2 devices for producing of radio interference based on the aircraft to the market of Saudi Arabia.

In 2016, “Antonov” and “Taqnia Aeronautics” signed an agreement on cooperation on the construction of aircraft complex and production of An-132 in the Kingdom of Saudi Arabia.

The result of one of the largest international exhibitions “DefExpo 2016” was the agreement on large-scale partnership in military-technical sphere with the Indian company “Reliance Defence Limited”. The parties signed three agreements in the sphere of aircraft and aircraft repair, modernization of armored vehicles, maintenance of marine engineering, production and supply of drones.

During the International Aerospace Salon “Farnborough Airshow 2016” in the UK, “Antonov” signed two contracts with the Canadian company “Esterline CMC Electronics”. Under the contracts, transport aircraft An-124 and An-148/158/178 will be equipped with modern avionics. In addition, “Antonov” and “General Electric” have agreed on modernization of Ukrainian planes. The company also signed a memorandum with “Pratt & Whitney Canada”.

“Ukroboronprom” also cooperates with NATO. Priority of cooperation is the development of a roadmap for Ukrainian defence industry transition to NATO standards, and deep partnership with EU member countries. In 2016, for the first time in the history of Ukraine, the Day of the Ukrainian defence industry was held in NATO Headquarters (Brussels, Belgium) and the headquarters of NATO Support and Procurement Agency (Kappelen, Luxembourg). “Ukroboronprom” presented its products there including a number of new projects.

In 2016, “Ukroboronprom” signed over 70 memorandums on cooperation with 20 countries.

At the LAAD-2017 Defence & Security held in April 2017 in Rio de Janeiro, Brazil, “Ukroboronprom” agreed on cooperation in aircraft and unmanned vehicles, radio intelligence and heavy armored vehicles with Central and South America countries.

At the international exhibition of arms IDEF-2017 in May 2017 in Turkey, the State Concern has agreed on direct cooperation with Undersecretary for Defense Industries under the Ministry of National Defence of Turkey. “Ukroboronprom” also signed the agreements with Turkish companies Aselsan, MKEK, TAI.

On July 10, 2017, NATO Secretary General Jens Stoltenberg highly appreciated “Antonov” transport aircraft during his visit to Kyiv. He discussed with the head of “Ukroboronprom” Roman Romanov the prospects for expanding the SALIS program on strategic transport activities for the member countries of NATO and speeding up the transition of the “Ukroboronprom” enterprises to produce products according to the NATO standards.

In the annual world rating of arms manufacturers of the analytical edition Defense News, “Ukroboronprom” took 62nd place. Western analysts have noted high rates of increase in production of modern military equipment. In 2016, “Ukroboronprom” took 68th place, while in 2015 – 92nd place.

In 2017, "Ukroboronprom" first participated in the international defence exhibition AUSA-2017 in the USA. "Ukroboronprom" introduced machinery, manufactured according to world standards. In particular, it presented an improved version of the unmanned armored personnel carrier "Phantom-2".

The latest achievements of the aviation cluster "Ukroboronprom" demonstrated at Dubai Airshow 2017 in the UAE.

Reforming strategy of the military-industrial complex of Ukraine 
In 2016, “Ukroboronprom” developed a strategy for reforming military-industrial complex of Ukraine. It consists of five key initiatives: corporatization, clustering, audit, a platform of innovations, and technologies protection. In 2016, Aircraft Corporation has been already created on the basis of “Antonov”. Four clusters are in the process of creation: armored vehicles, shipbuilding, high-precision weapon systems, radar, electronic warfare and communications. A technical task for an independent audit by leading international consulting and auditing companies was developed.

In May 2017, “Ukroboronprom” presented a new website presenting the strategy for reforming of the military-industrial complex of Ukraine – reformdefence.com. The site contains all important materials for each of the areas of strategy: corporatization, clustering, audit, technologies protection, and launch of the General Advanced Research and Development Agency (GARDA) that will be a platform to bring together developers, startups, investment funds, and military.

In November 2017, “Ukroboronprom” launched a new phase of reform – an international audit. A tender committee is formed to choose a consulting company. A Transparency International - Ukraine specialist is a member of the committee.

Associated products 
Ukroboronprom companies among others, manufacture such products:
 BTR-3E1
 BTR-4
 Mil Mi-8
 Mil Mi-17
 R-27
 T-84BM
 Hopak-61
 Unmanned aircraft multifunctional complex “Gorlytsa”
 Tactical unmanned multipurpose vehicle “Phantom”
 Combat module “Taipan”
 BMP-1UMD “Myslyvets”
 Light multipurpose aircraft An-132D

See also
 List of design bureaus in Ukraine

References

External links

—
Official Ukroboronservice website
Reformdefence.com: The Reform Strategy—
Rada.gov.ua: Government order for creation of the Ukroboronprom company

 
Defence companies of Ukraine
Military of Ukraine
Government-owned companies of Ukraine
Technology companies of Ukraine
State companies based in Kyiv
Conglomerate companies established in 2010
Technology companies established in 2010
Ukrainian companies established in 2010
Ukrainian brands